"Just Can't Last" is the first single from Natalie Merchant's 2001 album Motherland. The single version included more instruments and vocals than the original.

The single was released in two packages. The Australian package included Merchant sitting under an apple tree in color. (The picture had been used on Motherland). The regular package included a blue background with Natalie Merchant's name and the single name.

Release
"Just Can't Last" was released as a radio single in September 2001. The song was also made available via RealAudio streaming on Elektra Records' official artist site.

Track listing
Single-track CD
"Just Can't Last" (Single Remix)

Australian version
"Just Can't Last"
"Tell Yourself"
"I'm Not Gonna Beg"

Music video
In the "Just Can't Last" music video, directed by Liz Friedlander, Merchant comes into view and is standing in front of a white screen in a black dress. Throughout the video there are three crawls going across the screen trying to match up people's bodies. In the end, everyone's body matches up and the video ends with Merchant walking into the distance and fading out. The video utilizes the 3:56 single remix, rather than the longer album version of the song.

Personnel
Natalie Merchant – vocals
Gabriel Grodon – electric guitar
Allison Miller – drums, percussion
Eric Della Penna – acoustic guitar
Elizabeth Steen – organ

Charts
The single peaked at Number 30 on Billboard's Adult Top 40 chart on December 22, 2001.

References

External links
"Just Can't Last" on YouTube

2001 singles
Natalie Merchant songs
Song recordings produced by T Bone Burnett
2001 songs
Elektra Records singles
Songs written by Natalie Merchant